Paul Michael Talbot (born 11 August 1979) is an English former professional footballer who played as a defender or as a midfielder in the Football League for York City, in non-League football for Gateshead, Burton Albion and Spennymoor United, in the Scottish Football League for Queen of the South, and was on the books of Newcastle United without making a league appearance.

References

External links

1979 births
Living people
Footballers from Gateshead
English footballers
Association football defenders
Association football midfielders
Newcastle United F.C. players
York City F.C. players
Gateshead F.C. players
Burton Albion F.C. players
Queen of the South F.C. players
Spennymoor United F.C. players
English Football League players
National League (English football) players
Scottish Football League players